Jianyuniaceae is a family of fungi in the order Agaricostilbales. The family contains three genera. Species are known only from their yeast states.

References

External links

Basidiomycota families
Agaricostilbales